Shqipon Bektasi (born 14 September 1990) is a German professional footballer who plays as a forward for German club Bahlinger SC.

External links

Living people
1990 births
German footballers
Association football midfielders
SC Freiburg players
SC Freiburg II players
SV Waldhof Mannheim players
1. FC Heidenheim players
Wormatia Worms players
KSV Hessen Kassel players
Stuttgarter Kickers players
TSV Steinbach Haiger players
Bahlinger SC players
3. Liga players
Regionalliga players
People from Waldshut-Tiengen
Sportspeople from Freiburg (region)
Footballers from Baden-Württemberg